DHC Software Co., Ltd. (DHCC) is a publicly traded company based in Beijing. The company was a constituents of SZSE 100 Index, SZSE 300 Index and SZSE Component Index (top 100, 300 and 500 companies of Shenzhen Stock Exchange) .

The billionaire Xue Xiangdong is the co-founder and chairman of the company.

See also
 Donghua (disambiguation)

References

External links
 
Chinese brands
Companies based in Beijing
Companies listed on the Shenzhen Stock Exchange
Software companies of China